Hexthorpe & Balby North—consisting of Hexthorpe and the northern part of Balby—is one of 21 electoral wards in the Metropolitan Borough of Doncaster, South Yorkshire, England. It forms part of the Doncaster Central parliamentary constituency. It elects 2 councillors.

References 

Wards of Doncaster